Captain Swagger is a 1928 American silent crime drama film directed by Edward H. Griffith and stars Rod La Rocque. The film was produced and distributed by the Pathé Exchange company. Utilizing the RCA Photophone sound-on-film sound system, the film was rereleased in the United States with talking sequences, synchronized music, and sound effects.

Plot
In World War I daring but reckless pilot Hugh Drummond (Rod La Rocque) who is called "Captain Swagger", is stationed in France. During one fight with the infamous German ace, Baron Von Stahl (Ullrich Haupt), Hugh shoots him down but due to a sense of chivalry, lands behind enemy lines to pull Von Dictor out of his burning aircraft. Both aviators exchange weapons as a token of friendship. When a German patrol arrives, the Baron even helps Hugh escape.

When the war ends, Hugh has trouble establishing himself and after 10 years of a spendthrift life, he goes broke from living beyond his means, and turns to crime in order to make a living. In New York, on his first robbery, however, Hugh meets Sue Arnold (Sue Carol), an unemployed cabaret dancer, and gallantly escorts her to his apartment rather than robbing her wealthy escort.

Hugh and Sue become dancing partners in a cafe. Sue falls in love with Hugh, but worries that he will return to a life in crime when he meets his old nemesis Von Stahl, who really is a thief. Hugh is reformed and with Sue, the two make plans to go through life together.

Cast

 Rod La Rocque as Hugh Drummond ("Captain Swagger")
 Sue Carol as Sue Arnold
 Richard Tucker as Phil Poole
 Victor Potel as Jean
 Ullrich Haupt as Baron Von Stahl
 Maurice Black as Manager, Viennese Club (uncredited)
 Ray Cooke as Chauffeur (uncredited)
 Charlie Hall as Messenger (uncredited)
 William H. O'Brien as Waiter (uncredited)

Production
Principal photography on Captain Swagger began on June 4, 1928, with location shooting at Clover Airfield, Santa Monica. The aircraft from Wings (1927) were used in the production. These included the Airco DH.4, SPAD S.XIII and Fokker D.VII. The song:"Captain Swagger, All the Girls Adore You," was featured; words and music by Charles Weinberg and Irving Bibo.

The film's sets were designed by the art director Edward C. Jewell.

Reception
Mordaunt Hall in his review in the December 24, 1928 issue of The New York Times, commented on the actors: " 'Captain Swagger' is not only exceptionally entertaining but is also well acted. There are many deft touches in various spots; none of the situations are overdone. Mr. La Rocque plays his part in amiable fashion, giving to it the right amount of humor. Miss Carol, of course, is very pretty and in the rôle of Sue Arnold is more than acceptable." More recent reviews, however, by film historians Stephen Pendo and Michael Paris considered the film "pap".

Preservation status
Captain Swagger is preserved today at the George Eastman House Motion Picture Collection and a Danish Film Institute Archive facility.

References

Bibliography

 Orriss, Bruce W. When Hollywood Ruled the Skies: The Aviation Film Classics of World War I. Los Angeles: Aero Associates, 2013. .
 Paris, Michael. From the Wright Brothers to Top Gun: Aviation, Nationalism, and Popular Cinema. Manchester, UK: Manchester University Press, 1995. .
 Pendo, Stephen. Aviation in the Cinema. Lanham, Maryland: Scarecrow Press, 1985. .
 Skogsberg, Bertil. Wings on the Screen: A Pictorial History of Air Movies. London: Tantivy Press, 1987. .
 Wynne, H. Hugh. The Motion Picture Stunt Pilots and Hollywood's Classic Aviation Movies. Missoula, Montana: Pictorial Histories Publishing Co., 1987. .

External links
 
 
 
 

1928 films
American silent feature films
American aviation films
Films directed by Edward H. Griffith
Pathé Exchange films
American black-and-white films
American crime drama films
1928 crime drama films
1920s American films
Silent American drama films
1920s English-language films